Antonia Rey (born Maria Antonia Francesch,  – February 21, 2019) was a Cuban-born American actress.

Life and career
Rey was born in Havana, Cuba, the daughter of Emilia (née Rangel), a nurse, and Antonio Francesch, a dentist. She married theatre director Andres Castro in 1958during the intermission of a play. Despite offers of prominence in their fields, they chose to flee communist Cuba in 1961.

Rey's Broadway credits include The Rose Tattoo (1995), The Ritz (1975), A Streetcar Named Desire (1973), 42 Seconds from Broadway (1973), The Engagement Baby (1970), Camino Real (1970), Mike Downstairs (1968), and Bajour (1964).

Rey is better known for her cameos in various movies like Kiss Me, Guido (1997), Jacob's Ladder and King of the Gypsies, as well as the TV-movie pilot for Kojak entitled The Marcus-Nelson Murders. She has also appeared in shows such as Who's the Boss?, Third Watch, Law & Order and Law & Order: Criminal Intent.

Rey's final role was Assunta Bianchi, in the television series Happy!; her character dies in the second to last episode of the series, which aired three months after Rey's death, and featured a closing “In Memory” credit dedicated to Rey.

In 2003, she received the HOLA Lifetime Achievement Award from the Hispanic Organization of Latin Actors (HOLA).

Filmography

Film

Television

References

External links

1926 births
2019 deaths
Cuban film actresses
American film actresses
American television actresses
Cuban emigrants to the United States
Actresses from Havana
20th-century Cuban actresses
20th-century American actresses
21st-century American actresses